The General Liberation and Development Party (ABOP) is a political party in Suriname, founded and chaired by ex-rebel leader Ronnie Brunswijk in 1990 after several members of the BEP were expelled. The former Vice President of Suriname, Robert Ameerali, is a member of the ABOP.

As a consequence of having originally split from the BEP, ABOP is similarly more popular among the country's Maroon community, especially in interior areas of the country.

In 2020, General Liberation and Development Party formed a coalition government with new president Chan Santokhi's Progressive Reform Party. Leader Ronnie Brunswijk became new Vice President of Suriname.

Electoral results

References

External links
 ABOP: Algemene Bevrijdings- en Ontwikkelings Partij NOS, 26 March 2010 
 Official website

Political parties in Suriname
Political parties of minorities
Surinamese Maroons